Federico Luppi (February 23, 1936 – October 20, 2017) was an Argentine-Spanish film, TV, radio and theatre actor. He won numerous awards throughout his acting career, including a Concha de Plata at the San Sebastian International Film Festival.

Biography
Luppi worked mostly in Argentine cinema, but also worked in Chile, Mexico, Spain, and the United States. He acted in almost 100 films and 50 television series from the time of his debut in 1964. His first films were Pajarito Gómez and Psique y sexo in 1965. In 2004, he directed his first film, Pasos (Steps), made in Spain.

His English-language films (and his work with international directors) include John Sayles' Men with Guns and Los pasos perdidos, among others.

He was one of Guillermo del Toro's favorite actors, and they worked together in three of del Toro's films: Cronos, The Devil's Backbone and Pan's Labyrinth.

Amongst other awards he received a Konex Merit Diploma for his acting in three editions of the Entertainment Konex awards (1981, 1991 and 2001). He was also nominated in 1996 for the Goya Awards as "Best Actor in a Leading Role" for Nobody Will Speak of Us When We're Dead.

Luppi acquired Spanish citizenship in June 2003. He appeared in the film The 33 in 2015.

Selected filmography

 Pajarito Gómez (1965)
 Psique y Sexo (1965) (Manuel Antin con Fernanda Mistral) 
 Todo sol es amargo (1966)
 El ABC del amor (1967) as Toto (segment "Noche terrible")
 El Romance del Aniceto y la Francisca (1967, directed by Leonardo Favio) as Aniceto
 El Derecho a la felicidad (1968)
 Las Ruteras (1968) as Camionero
 El Proyecto (1969, inedit)
 Después del último tren (1969)
 Pasión dominguera (1970)
 Los herederos (1970) as Carlos
 Mosaico (1970) as Marcelo
 Paula contra la mitad más uno (1971) as Mike González
 Crónica de una señora (1971)
 La revolución (1973)
 Las Venganzas de Beto Sánchez (1973) as Juanjo
 La flor de la mafia (1974) as Luis Alterio
 La Patagonia rebelde (1974, directed by Hector Olivera) as Jose Font, 'Facon Grande'
 Triángulo de cuatro (1975)
 Yo maté a Facundo (1975) as Santos Pérez
 Una mujer (1975)
 Juan que reía (1976) as Sr. Baiocco
 Tiempo de revancha (1981, directed by Adolfo Aristarain) as Pedro Bengoa
 Últimos días de la víctima (1982) as Raúl Mendizábal
 Plata dulce (1982) as Carlos Bonifatti
 El arreglo (1983) as Luis
 No habrá más penas ni olvido (1983, directed by Hector Olivera) as Ignacio Fuentes
 Pasajeros de una pesadilla (1984) as Bernardo Fogelman
 Luna caliente (1985) as Braulio Tennembaum
 Cocaine Wars (1985, directed by Hector Olivera) as Gonzalo Reyes
 La vieja música (1985, directed by Mario Camus) as Martín Lobo
 Les Longs Manteaux (1986) as Garcia
 Sobredosis (1986)
 Sostenido en La menor (1986)
 Malayunta (1986) as Bernardo
 Los líos de Susana (1986)
 El año del conejo (1987) as Pepé Tinelli
 The Stranger (1987, directed by Adolfo Aristarain) as Manager
 La amiga (1988) as Pancho
 Después del último tren (1989)
 Isla se alquila por hora (1989)
 I Don't Owe 100 Times (Cien veces no debo) (1990) as Millán
 Flop (1990) as Grimlat
 Guerriers et captives (1990) as Colonel Garay
 Las tumbas (1991) as Espiga
 Un lugar en el mundo (1992, directed by Adolfo Aristarain) as Domingo
 Matar al abuelito (1993) as Don Mariano Aguero
 Cronos (1993, directed by Guillermo del Toro) as Jesus Gris
 Sin opción (1995)
 Caballos salvajes (1995, directed by Marcelo Piñeyro) as Eusebio
 La ley de la frontera (1995) as El Argentino
 Nadie hablará de nosotras cuando hayamos muerto (1995) as Eduardo
 Extasis (1996) as Daniel
 Sol de otoño (1996, directed by Eduardo Mignogna) as Raul Ferraro
 Martín (Hache) (1997, directed by Adolfo Aristarain) as Martín
 Bajo Bandera (1997, directed by Juan José Jusid) as Coronel Hellman
 Men with Guns (1997) as Dr. Fuentes
 Frontera Sur (1998) as Ciriaco Maidana
 Lisboa (1999, directed by Antonio Hernández) as José Luis
 Las huellas borradas (1999, directed by Enrique Gabriel Lipschutz) as Manuel Perea
 Divertimento (2000) as Daniel Osantos
 Rosarigasinos (2001) as Tito
 El espinazo del diablo (2001, directed by Guillermo del Toro) as Dr. Casares
 Los pasos perdidos (2001) as Bruno Leardi
 El lugar donde estuvo el paraíso (2002) as Consul
 El último tren (2002, directed by Diego Arsuaga) as Pepe
 La balsa de piedra (2002) as Pedro
 Lugares comunes (2002, directed by Adolfo Aristarain) as Fernando Robles
 Machuca (2004, directed by Andrés Wood) as Roberto Ochagavía
 Incautos (2004, directed by Miguel Bardem) as Federico
 Pasos (2005) as Amigo de José
 Elsa & Fred (2005) as Pablo
 El viento (2005, directed by Eduardo Mignogna) as Frank Osorio
 El buen destino (2005, directed by Leonor Benedetto) as Manuel
 Pan's Labyrinth (2006, directed by Guillermo del Toro) as Rey
 La distancia (2006) as Entrenador
 Cara de queso (2006, directed by Ariel Winograd) as Sr. Guerchuni
 La habitación de Fermat (2007, directed by Luis Piedrahita and Rodrigo Sopeña) as Fermat
 El último justo (2007, directed by Manuel Carballo) as El Hombre del Puzzle
 La luna en botella (2007, directed by Grojo) as Rubén Cumplido
 Ese beso (2008, Short, directed by Kamala López)
 Que parezca un accidente (2008, directed by Gerardo Herrero) as Arturo
 Cuestión de principios (2009, directed by Rodrigo Grande) as Adalberto Castilla
 Verano amargo (2009, directed by Juan Carlos Desanzo)
 Sin retorno (2010, directed by Miguel Cohan) as Víctor Marchetti
 Phase 7 (2010, directed by Nicolás Goldbart) as Zanutto
 Cuatro de copas (2011, directed by Pablo Yotich)
 Acorralados (2012) as Antonio Funes
 Puerta de Hierro, el exilio de Perón (2012) as Dr. Antonio Puigvert
 The Corporation (2012) as Dalmaso
 Cuatro de copas (2012)
 Inevitable (2013)
 El gurí (2015)
 Magallanes (2016) as Coronel
 Al final del túnel (2016) as Guttman
 Siete semillas (2016) as Manuel
 Nieve negra (2017, directed by Martín Hodara) as Sepia
 Necronomicón (2018) as Dieter (final film role)

Awards (partial)
Wins
 Los Angeles Latino International Film Festival: Lifetime Achievement Award, 2003.
 Havana Film Festival: Honorary Award, 2002.
 Mar del Plata Film Festival: Best Actor, for: Rosarigasinos, 2001.
 Huelva Latin American Film Festival: Prize of the City of Huelva, 2000.
 Fantasporto: International Fantasy Film Award, Best Actor, for: Cronos, 1993.
 Argentine Film Critics Association Awards: Won six awards for best actor, a record unbroken up to this day.

References

External links

  (in English)
 
 
 Federico Luppi – Interview to Diagonal 

1936 births
2017 deaths
Argentine male film actors
Argentine people of Italian descent
People from Buenos Aires Province
Naturalised citizens of Spain
Argentine emigrants to Spain
Burials at La Chacarita Cemetery